The 1924 Vanderbilt Commodores football team represented Vanderbilt University in the 1924 Southern Conference football season. The 1924 season was Dan McGugin's 20th year as head coach. Members of the Southern Conference, the Commodores played six home games in Nashville, Tennessee, at Dudley Field and finished the season with a record of 6–3–1 (3–3 SoCon).  Vanderbilt outscored its opponents 150–53. Fred Russell's Fifty Years of Vanderbilt Football dubs it "the most eventful season in the history of Vanderbilt football."

Highlights of the year include Vanderbilt's first win over a Northern school, defeating Minnesota 16–0, and its first win in Atlanta over Georgia Tech since 1906, from a single drop-kick by consensus All-American Hek Wakefield.  Georgia also beat Vanderbilt for the first time in twenty-seven years, as did Sewanee for the first time in ten as well as last time. On November 9, Vanderbilt played the school's 279th game and defeated Mississippi A&M 18–0 for the 200th win in the school's football program.

Before the season

"This was the most eventful season in the history of Vanderbilt football...The Commodores rose from the depths of despair to the heights of joy, then back again. It was the year of a thousand thrills, a thousand sobs" says Fred Russell of the year that was 1924. The Commodores had a stout freshman team the year before, and had just won its third Southern title in a row. Many stayed from the 1923 team, including two All-American ends in Lynn Bomar and Hek Wakefield. Bomar played halfback this year, and was expected to receive All-American honors at that position by season's end. All-Southern players at halfback in Gil Reese, and on the line in Bob Rives and captain Tuck Kelly, also returned for the 1924 campaign.

Instead of in Nashville as usual, Vanderbilt practiced at Camp Sycamore, some 40 miles outside of Nashville. The Commodores practiced there up until just a week before its first game. Vanderbilt had been scheduled to open the season against the Howard Bulldogs on September 27, but the sudden death of their coach led to Henderson-Brown taking their place.

Schedule

Season Summary

Week 1: Henderson-Brown

Sources:

Vanderbilt opened the season in the rain on September 27, 1924, against  at Dudley Field in Nashville, winning by a score of 13–0. End Hek Wakefield scored both touchdowns.  The first came after captain and guard Tuck Kelly blocked a punt, the other on a pass into the end zone from quarterback Nig Waller. Tom Ryan did well punting and plunging.

Week 2: Birmingham–Southern
In the second week of play, Gil Reese scored five touchdowns as Vanderbilt smothered the Birmingham–Southern Panthers 61–0. The score was not so expected, for the Panthers had held Auburn to merely a 7–0 victory the week before.

The Commodores beat Birmingham–Southern "on straight football and a simple pass."  Bomar also had a punt return for a touchdown. Ralph McGill described Reese's day: "He stars. A man dashes at him and goes sprawling on the ground. There is another. A twist of the body and a step to the side and he is gone, left to lie on the sod and meditate on the fate that is his. Three or four men rush at him. There is a swirl of action, flying feet and diving bodies, and out of it—Reese running with the grace of a deer. Reese's action is never desperate. He never seems harassed or hurried. His spectacular runs are things of athletic beauty, There is no lost motion. It is perfect." Tackle Frank "Buddy" Cairns of the Panthers was given praise for his showing against Vanderbilt.

Week 3: Quantico Marines

Sources:

The Vanderbilt Commodores and the United States Marine Corps "Devil Dogs" football team from the Quantico Marine Corps Base in Virginia, "one of the finest, best-trained group of football players ever to appear in Nashville" battled to a hard-fought tie of 13–13 in week three.  The Marines got the upper-hand for three quarters.

In the first quarter, the Quantico Marines' halfback Boots Groves fumbled the ball at the 16-yard line, picked up by Lynn Bomar who ran the 84 yards for the touchdown.
 
A newspaper account describes the play, "It was Lynn Bomar's gigantic figure that broke up what looked like a Marine cakewalk. After receiving the kickoff, the Marines drove steadily to Vanderbilt's 10-yard line as Goettge repeatedly completed short passes. At the 10, Groves dropped back. The pass from center was low. He missed it. He reached for the ball. It trickled off his fingers. The Commodores were boring in. Wakefield was in there. Then Bomar came charging through. He picked up the ball and with a twist was out of Groves' grasp. He came out of the bunch with a long, charging run. Then he seemed a little undecided. One fleeting glance behind him and he struck out. Up came his free arm to brush off his headgear. His thin, yellow hair stood out. On he swept like a thundercloud of vengeance across the goal. Bedlam broke loose."

The Marines gained from an exchange of punts after this, and started a drive from their own 25-yard line which ended in a touchdown. Quantico captain and quarterback Frank Goettge and fullback Orville Neal starred on the drive.  On fourth down, a pass to end Lawson Sanderson got the score. Vanderbilt then gained on a 59-yard drive of its own with a flurry of forward passes; as well as runs from Tom Ryan through the line and Gil Reese around it. Reese eventually ran into the end zone.  The point after was good.

To open the second half, Nig Waller fumbled the kickoff. The Marines recovered and were already near the goal.  The Commodores' line held the Marines scoreless inside the 10-yard line on three separate occasions, mostly due to Hek Wakefield, Bob Ledyard, and Jess Keene. In the final period, the Marines got their touchdown. Goettge completed a long pass to Clarence Kyle, and then ran it himself down to the Commodores' 6-yard line. After a line play failed, a pass from Goettge to halfback Tom Henry scored a touchdown. Willis Ryckman kicked goal, and the game ended as a tie.

The Marines had two whole other teams worth of reserves, unlike Vanderbilt; namely from the Navy Scouting Reel and Mohawk Athletic Club, one of which played in the second half of this contest. Commodore captain Tuck Kelly was injured in this game. He sat on the bench the rest of the year except for five minutes of the Tulane game the next week.

Starting lineup for Vanderbilt against Quantico Marines: Wakefield (left end), Rives (left tackle), Lawrence (left guard), Keene (center), Kelly (right guard), Walker (right tackle), McKibbon (right end), Waller (quarterback), Reese (left halfback), Bomar (right halfback), Ryan (fullback).

Week 4: at Tulane

Sources:

In the fourth game, Vanderbilt lost to the Tulane Green Wave in a "heart-breaker", 21-13. Vanderbilt got the best of Tulane in the first half, with a strong second half from the Green Wave deciding the game. A relaying of the first downs details the shift in the game. Vanderbilt got 18 first downs to Tulane's 16, and Vandy made 14 of those in the first half while Tulane made 3.  The backfield of Tulane was the shining feature of the game, particularly Lester Lautenschlaeger, Brother Brown, Peggy Flournoy, and Harvey Wilson.

The starting lineup for Vanderbilt against Tulane: Cargile (left end), Rives (left tackle), Lawrence (left guard), Ledyard (center), Bryan (right guard), Walker (right tackle), Wakefield (right end), N. Waller (quarterback), Bomar (left halfback), Reese (right halfback), Ryan (fullback).

Week 5: Georgia

Sources:

In the fifth week of play, Vanderbilt lost to the Georgia Bulldogs by a score of 3–0.  The first victory for Georgia over Vanderbilt in twenty-seven "long years," having failed to win the last seven matches. The Commodores did well in the first quarter, but never threatened again after that. Georgia had 12 first downs to Vandy's 7, and the Bulldogs gained 284 yards to the Commodores' 128. The furthest the Commodores penetrated was to Georgia's 31-yard line. Thrice the Bulldogs got to within Vanderbilt's 10-yard line, but all three times the Vanderbilt defense stiffened and prevented a score. Bulldog quarterback and later Chattanooga Mocs coach "Scrappy" Moore made the drop-kick which broke the scoreless tie. The Bulldogs were coached by George "Kid" Woodruff.

In the second quarter, Georgia, back Buster Kilpatrick ran from the 5 to the 45-yard line. Runs from Ike Sherlock and a 20-yard run by Kilpatrick got the ball to the 6-yard line.  Three runs failed, and an attempted pass on fourth down was grounded. Another drive, highlighted by the run by Sherlock of 23 yards, got Georgia to the 7-yard line.  Here again the Commodores stood tall and stopped the Bulldogs going any further. On the ensuing series was the short bright spot for Vanderbilt.  Waller slung the ball 30 yards to Hek Wakefield, who ran for 20 more yards before being tackled.  A pass from Gil Reese was then intercepted by Thomason to quell the threat.  The Bulldogs gained more in the second quarter than the Commodores did all game.

1923 consensus All-American Lynn Bomar suffered an injury this day which ended his career with Vanderbilt football. A kick to the chin from a cleat gave him a severe brain hemorrhage, leaving him with half of his body paralyzed for two days. It was figured he would never play football again. "Not a player on the team could talk of Bomar's injury without tears coming to his eyes." The next year, he defied the odds and play professional football in the inaugural season for the New York Giants, leaving after 1926 from a different injury.

Scrappy Moore made the 32-yard drop-kick to seal the game for the Bulldogs in the fourth quarter. The ball just passed over the cross bar. Georgia's passing game got them again to Vanderbilt's 10-yard line when the game ended. Vanderbilt made just one first down in the second half.  Of its 30-second half yards, 23 came on a desperate pass near the end. Guard Zach Coles was discovered on this day, coming in for McKibbon he single-handedly stopped one of Georgia's goal line threats.

The starting lineup for Vanderbilt against Georgia: Wakefield (left end), Rives (left tackle), Lawrence (left guard), Keene (center), Ledyard (right guard), Walker (right tackle), McKibbon (right end), Waller (quarterback), Bomar (left halfback), Reese (right halfback), Ryan (fullback).

Week 6: Auburn

Sources:

On November 1, 1924, the Vanderbilt Commodores defeated Auburn at Dudley Field 13–0. Vanderbilt's passing game was employed often to great success. The Commodores "regained much of their lost confidence this game." Both Vanderbilt touchdowns were due to end Hek Wakefield, who acted as captain with recent injuries suffered by both Tuck Kelly and Lynn Bomar. Kelly was resting injuries he had received in the Quantico Marines game. Auburn was coached by Boozer Pitts.

In the first quarter, Wakefield picked up a blocked punt and ran 40 yards for the touchdown. A long pass in the second quarter from end Fred McKibbon to Hek Wakefield resulted in Hek running it in for the touchdown. McKibbon connected with Waller on another long pass in the third quarter, but the Auburn defense held strong.

The starting lineup was: Wakefield (left end), Walker (left tackle), Bryan (left guard), Keene(center), Lawrence (right guard), Rives (right tackle), McKibbon (right end), G. Waller (quarterback), Reese (left halfback), Hendrix (right halfback), Ryan (fullback).

Week 7: Mississippi A & M

Sources:

The Vanderbilt Commodores beat the Mississippi A & M Aggies in the seventh week of play 18–0. Coach Lewie Hardage had come back from scouting the Aggies, giving the sense the Commodores were sure to lose. Mississippi A & M gave Tulane its only loss this year. The game was mired with rain, mud, and many fumbles. Vanderbilt coach Dan McGugin, who was in the hospital with pneumonia, dressed and left his bed to meet with his team between halves. The Aggies were coached by Earl Abell.

During the first quarter, Gil Reese caught a punt from the Aggies' halfback Patty and ran 54 yards for a touchdown behind excellent blocking. The try was missed. In the second quarter, James Walker recovered a fumble on the Aggies' 20-yard line, and fullback Tom Ryan plowed through the line multiple times, eventually getting a touchdown.

The Commodores blocked a punt in the third quarter at the Aggies' 20-yard line.  The fifth play of the drive was a touchdown run from Tom Ryan.  The final quarter was a punting duel, with the ball largely in Mississippi A & M territory and the punts of Ryan starring. The Aggies punter, Patty, did well all over as well. Gil Reese's running through broken fields was also cited as a positive feature of Vanderbilt's play that day. Bob Rives was the star of the Commodores line at tackle. The Aggies did not complete a single pass, nor make a single first down. Vanderbilt's yearbook, The Commodore said of the game that it "proved conclusively that the 1923 tie game was due to the mud."

The starting lineup for Vanderbilt against Mississippi A & M: Wakefield (left end), Rives (left tackle), Coles (left guard), Keene (center), Bryan (right guard), Walker (right tackle), McKibbon (right end), Cargile (quarterback), Reese (left halfback), Hendrix (right halfback), Ryan (fullback).

Week 8: at Georgia Tech

Sources:

On November 15, the Vanderbilt Commodores traveled to Atlanta to play the Georgia Tech Golden Tornado at Grant Field. Georgia Tech was coached by William Alexander. The Commodores were followed by the largest crowd ever to accompany Vanderbilt on a trip, with five special sections. The lone score of the game could largely be credited to halfback Gil Reese. Vanderbilt elected to start the game with the wind at its back, hoping for an edge in punts which would lead to good field position early. Reese caught one of these punts in these exchanges on the fly and, noticing both of Tech's ends blocked to the ground, raced to within striking distance of the end zone. From there, Hek Wakefield made a drop kick. Wakefield was the star of the game; "He was death on returning punts and when he started around the ends the Tech stars groaned", recalls one account.

Georgia Tech's one chance to score came when fullback Douglas Wycoff missed a kick low, partially blocked by Vanderbilt. Hendrix attempted to recover but missed, and Georgia Tech retained possession at the 4-yard line. On first down, a snap from center missed Wycoff, and Vanderbilt fullback Tom Ryan recovered the ball at the 15-yard line, and later punted it away to safety. The game was a defensive scrap the rest of the way.

Gil Reese gained −15 yards rushing, and Wycoff was stopped all game. Bip Farnsworth was the Tornado's lone consistent ground gainer. The punting battle between Douglas Wycoff and Tom Ryan was one of the few noted features of the game. It was the first win for Vanderbilt in Atlanta since 1906. The Commodores used a single substitute, Fatty Lawrence.

The starting lineup was Wakefield (left end), Rives (left tackle), Coles (left guard), Keene (center), Bryan (right guard), Walker (right tackle), McKibbon (right end), Waller  (quarterback), Reese (left halfback), Hendrix (right halfback), Ryan (fullback).

Week 9: at Minnesota

Sources:

Vanderbilt traveled north to play an intersectional match with the Minnesota Golden Gophers. Minnesota in the previous week beat the defending national champion, Red Grange led Illinois. The Gophers were heavy favorites. Vanderbilt gave Minnesota its worst loss of the year, winning 16–0.

A newspaper account reflects this, "The Gophers were badly outplayed during the four quarters." The Commodores made not one substitution in their first defeat of a northern school. "It was the most glorious victory in the annals of Vanderbilt and Southern football" said the Vanderbilt yearbook.  The Golden Gophers were coached by William Spaulding.

The first touchdown drive ended when Tom Ryan broke through a hole created by Bob Rives, finishing a 63-yard march.  A pass from Ox McKibbon to Gil Reese, and off tackle runs by Ryan, Reese, and Neil Cargile put the Commodores in the position to score. Vanderbilt did not get a single first down in the second quarter.

In the second half, Wakefield kicked a 27-yard field goal.  Two forward passes help Vanderbilt reach the spot. Later, McKibbon threw a pass which gained 18 yards, and then threw another one of 10 yards, to Reese, who ran in the score. "It was the best coached team we saw this year", said the Minnesota newspapermen. Blinkey Horn, sportswriter for the Nashville Tennessean, reported the jubilance following the win:

Starting lineup for Vanderbilt against Minnesota: Wakefield (left end), Rives (left tackle), Lawrence (left guard), Keene (center), Coles (right guard), Walker (right tackle), McKibbon (right end), Cargile (quarterback), Reese (left halfback), Hendrick (right halfback), Ryan (fullback).

Week 10: Sewanee

Sources:

In the annual contest between Vanderbilt and the Sewanee Tigers on Thanksgiving Day, Sewanee won for the first time in a decade by the score of 16–0. The student newspaper The Sewanee Purple labeled it "The Greatest Victory for Sewanee in Its Thirty-one Years of Football History." Vanderbilt coach Dan McGugin stated "Sewanee played a brilliant, sustained game. It was her day all the way." Michigan coach Fielding Yost said of the game, "It was one of those days when everything you try goes wrong and everything the other fellow tries goes right. Sewanee played great football." Gil Reese was relatively controlled and Bob Rives' line play was adequately challenged. Gil Reese and Fatty Lawrence starred for the Commodores. Sewanee's backfield of  captain Harris, Gibbons, Barker, and Mahoney "clicked to perfection" and its line received much praise as well. It's the last time Sewanee has beaten Vanderbilt.

The starting lineup for Vanderbilt against Sewanee: Wakefield (left end), Rives (left tackle), Lawrence (left guard), Keene (center), Coles (right guard), Walker (right tackle), McKibbon (right end), Cargile (quarterback), Reese (left halfback), Hendrix (right halfback), Ryan (fullback).

Postseason
Hek Wakefield was consensus All-America. Gil Reese selected All-American by Norman E. Brown. Wakefield, Reese, and Bob Rives were all selected All-Southern.

Personnel

Depth chart
The following chart provides a visual depiction of Vanderbilt's lineup during the 1924 season with games started at the position reflected in parenthesis. The chart mimics a short punt formation while on offense, with the quarterback under center.

Varsity Letter Winners

Line

Backfield

Scoring leaders

Coaching staff
 Dan McGugin (Michigan '03), head coach
 Josh Cody (Vanderbilt '19), assistant coach
 Lewie Hardage (Vanderbilt '12), backfield coach
 Tom Zerfoss (Vanderbilt '19), assistant and freshman coach.
 Ed Blackman, manager.

See also
 1924 College Football All-America Team
 1924 College Football All-Southern Team

References

Bibliography

External links
 Tulane-Vandy program

Vanderbilt
Vanderbilt Commodores football seasons
Vanderbilt Commodores football